Yoksan Ama (born 22 September 1986) is an Indonesian professional footballer who currently plays as a forward for Perseru Serui in the Indonesia Super League.

Career

Perseru Serui
Ama was part of the team that successfully got Perseru promoted to the Indonesia Super League for the first time in their history, after beating Persik Kediri by a penalty shoot-out in the 2013 Liga Indonesia Premier Division knockout stage semi-final.

Ama scored his first two goals in the Indonesia Super League in a match that ended 4–1 for Perseru Serui against Persepam Madura United on 2 February 2014.

Honours

Club
Perseru Serui
Runner-up
 Liga Indonesia Premier Division: 2013

References

External links
 
 Player profil at goal.com

1986 births
Living people
Indonesian footballers
Liga 1 (Indonesia) players
Perseru Serui players
Badak Lampung F.C. players
Association football forwards